Oswaldo Mackenzie (born 19 January 1973) is a Colombian former footballer who played as a midfielder. He played for clubs of Colombia, Ecuador, Venezuela, Peru and Paraguay. He also played for the Colombia national football team.

Career
Mackenzie played professional football for Junior de Barranquilla, Real Cartagena, Atlético Nacional, Centauros Villavicencio, Unión Magdalena, Deportes Quindío and América de Cali in Colombia, and Barcelona Sporting Club, Alianza Lima, Estudiantes de Mérida and Club Olimpia abroad.

Teams
  Atlético Junior 1990–1991
  Real Cartagena 1992
  Atlético Junior 1993–1995
  Atlético Nacional 1996–2000
  Barcelona SC 2001
  Atlético Nacional 2001
  Atlético Junior 2002
  Centauros Villavicencio 2003
  Atlético Nacional 2004
  Alianza Lima 2005
  Unión Magdalena 2005
  Estudiantes de Mérida 2005
  Club Olimpia 2006
  Deportes Quindío 2006
  Real Cartagena 2007
  América de Cali 2007
  Atlético Junior 2008

Titles
  Atlético Junior 1993, 1995 (Colombian League)
  Atlético Nacional 1999 (Colombian League)
  Atlético Nacional 1998, 2000 (Copa Merconorte)

References

External links
 Profile at BDFA 
 

1973 births
Living people
Colombian footballers
Colombia international footballers
Atlético Junior footballers
Real Cartagena footballers
Atlético Nacional footballers
Barcelona S.C. footballers
Centauros Villavicencio footballers
Club Alianza Lima footballers
Unión Magdalena footballers
Estudiantes de Mérida players
Club Olimpia footballers
Deportes Quindío footballers
América de Cali footballers
Categoría Primera A players
Colombian expatriate footballers
Expatriate footballers in Ecuador
Expatriate footballers in Peru
Expatriate footballers in Venezuela
Expatriate footballers in Paraguay
Association football midfielders
Footballers from Barranquilla
Footballers at the 1995 Pan American Games
Pan American Games bronze medalists for Colombia
Pan American Games medalists in football
Medalists at the 1995 Pan American Games